The 1902 association football match between Uruguay and Argentina was not only the first international match for both sides, but the first international held in South America. Argentina won 6–0, initiating a longtime rivalry between both teams, that have met more than 190 times since that first encounter, becoming the international derby with the most matches played worldwide, surpassing even the England–Scotland rivalry, which, first held in 1872, is the oldest fixture in the world.

Overview 
One year before, There had been a precedent when representatives from both sides met in a match also in Montevideo, although it was not organised by any association and therefore is not considered official. Moreover, the match was organised by local club Albion in its home field located in Paso del Molino, Montevideo. The Uruguayan side had nine players from that club and the remainder from Nacional. Argentina won the match by 3–2.

In 1902, both associations, AUF and AFA, agreed to play a match in the same venue. President of AFA, Francis Hepburn Chevallier-Boutell and Lomas A.C. player Juan O. Anderson selected the players for the match. Chevallier-Boutell also chose the uniforms, so Uruguay played in a blue shirt with a white diagonal sash while Argentine wore light blue shirts. Argentina easily beat Uruguay 6–0, with Carlos Dickinson making history after scoring the first goal of the match. Uruguay starting line-up included eight players from Nacional and three from Albion, while Argentina team was formed by players from Alumni (5), Quilmes (2), Belgrano A.C. (2), Lomas (1), and Barracas A.C. (1).

During a long lapse of time, Argentina and Uruguay played each other exclusively so no other national teams had been formed in South America. 8,000 spectators attended the match. Both sides played thirteen consecutive times between 1902 and 1909, giving birth to a strong rivalry that remained through the years. Some competitions contested by Argentina and Uruguay were soon created, such as Copa Lipton (first held in 1905), and Copa Newton (started in 1906).

Match details

See also 
 Argentina–Uruguay football rivalry
 History of the Argentina national football team
 1872 Scotland v England football match

References 

International association football matches
Argentina–Uruguay football rivalry
u
u
1902 in Uruguayan football
1902 in Argentine football
July 1902 sports events
Football in Montevideo